The Deputy Prime Minister of Greece ("Vice-President of the Government"; older form: Αντιπρόεδρος του  Υπουργικού  Συμβουλίου, "Vice-President of the Ministerial Council") is the second senior-most member of the Greek Cabinet. Despite the English translation of the title, he does not actually deputize for the Prime Minister, rather it is a mostly honorific post for senior ministers, and is usually combined with another senior government portfolio (traditionally either Foreign Affairs, Finance or Defence) or a coordinating role over several ministries. The post is not permanent, rather it is created on an ad hoc basis, usually for the leaders of junior parties in coalition cabinets, and may be held by more than one person at once.

The current Deputy Prime Minister is Panagiotis Pikrammenos, in the Cabinet of Kyriakos Mitsotakis.

List of deputy prime ministers of Greece
1862–1863: Konstantinos Kanaris
1862–1863: Benizelos Roufos
1916–1917: Pavlos Kountouriotis (Thessaloniki government)
1916–1917: Panagiotis Danglis (Thessaloniki government)
1919–1920: Emmanouil Repoulis
1929–1932: Andreas Michalakopoulos
1932: Andreas Michalakopoulos
1932: Stylianos Gonatas (provisional)
1935: Georgios Kondylis
1935: Ioannis Theotokis
1936: Ioannis Metaxas
1936–1937: Konstantinos Zavitsianos
1941–1942: Alexandros Sakellariou (Government-in-exile after 23 May 1941)
1942–1943: Panagiotis Kanellopoulos (Government-in-exile)
1941–1942: Konstantinos Logothetopoulos (Collaborationist government)
1942–1944: Georgios Rousos (Government-in-exile)
1944: Ektor Tsironikos (Collaborationist government)
1944: Evripidis Bakirtzis ("Mountain government")
1944: Sofoklis Venizelos (Government-in-exile)
1945: Kyriakos Varvaresos
1945–1946: Georgios Kafantaris
1945–1946: Emmanouil Tsouderos
1947: Konstantinos Tsaldaris
1947: Sofoklis Venizelos
1947–1949: Konstantinos Tsaldaris
1947–1949: Ioannis Ioannidis (Communist government)
1949: Alexandros Diomidis
1949–1950: Konstantinos Tsaldaris
1949–1950: Sofoklis Venizelos
1950: Panagiotis Kanellopoulos
1950: Georgios Papandreou
1950–1951: Georgios Papandreou
1950: Konstantinos Tsaldaris
1951: Emmanouil Tsouderos
1951–1952: Sofoklis Venizelos
1954–1955: Panagiotis Kanellopoulos
1954–1955: Stefanos Stefanopoulos
1956–1957: Andreas Apostolidis
1959–1961: Panagiotis Kanellopoulos
1961: Ioannis Paraskevopoulos
1961–1963: Panagiotis Kanellopoulos
1963: Sofoklis Venizelos
1963: Stefanos Stefanopoulos
1964–1965: Stefanos Stefanopoulos
1965–1966: Georgios Athanasiadis-Novas
1965–1966: Ilias Tsirimokos
1967: Grigorios Spandidakis
1967–1973: Stylianos Pattakos
1968–1971: Dimitrios Patilis
1971–1973: Nikolaos Makarezos
1973: Charilaos Mitrelias
1974: Georgios Mavros
1977–1981: Konstantinos Papakonstantinou
1981: Evangelos Averoff
1985–1988: Ioannis Charalambopoulos
1987–1988: Menios Koutsogiorgas
1990–1993: Tzannis Tzannetakis
1990–1992: Athanasios Kanellopoulos
2009–2012: Theodoros Pangalos
2011–2012: Evangelos Venizelos
2013–2015: Evangelos Venizelos
2015 (January–August): Yannis Dragasakis
2015–2019: Yannis Dragasakis
2019–present: Panagiotis Pikrammenos

External links
Website of the Deputy Prime Minister of Greece
Greek ministries, etc – Rulers.org

Government of Greece
 
Greece